Sahibganj College, established in 1951, is a general degree college in Sahibganj, Jharkhand. It offers undergraduate courses in arts, commerce and sciences. It is affiliated to  Sido Kanhu Murmu University.

Accreditation
Sahibganj College was accredited by the National Assessment and Accreditation Council (NAAC).

See also

References

External links
http://www.sahibganjcollege.in/About.aspx

Colleges affiliated to Sido Kanhu Murmu University
Universities and colleges in Jharkhand
Sahibganj district
Educational institutions established in 1951
1951 establishments in Bihar